Janse van der Ryst (born 24 January 1967) is an educator and former South African former cricketer. He played in one List A and two first-class matches for Boland in 1991/92.

He is the current headmaster of Queen's College Boys' High School and a former deputy headmaster of Jeppe High School for Boys.

See also
 List of Boland representative cricketers

References

External links
 

1967 births
Living people
South African cricketers
Boland cricketers
People from Mossel Bay
Cricketers from the Western Cape